The Good Delivery specification is a set of rules issued by the London Bullion Market Association (LBMA) describing the physical characteristics of gold and silver bars used in settlement in the wholesale London bullion market. It also puts forth requirements for listing on the LBMA Good Delivery List of approved refineries.

Good Delivery bars are notable for their large size and high purity.  They are the type normally used in the major international markets (Hong Kong, London, New York, Sydney, Tokyo, and Zürich) and in the gold reserves of governments, central banks, and the IMF.

The Good Delivery Rules for Gold and Silver Bars 
The entire Good Delivery specification is contained in the LBMA document titled The Good Delivery Rules for Gold and Silver Bars: Specifications for Good Delivery Bars and Application Procedures for Listing. The document includes specific requirements regarding the fineness, weight, dimensions, appearance, marks, and production of gold and silver bars. It specifies procedures for weighing, packing, and delivery. It also describes policies for ensuring refiners' compliance with the specifications.

The current edition of the Good Delivery Rules was published in January 2019.

Basic specifications

Gold bars 
 Fineness: minimum of 995.0 parts per thousand fine gold
 Marks: serial number, refiner's hallmark, fineness, year of manufacture
 Gold content: 
 Recommended dimensions
 Length (top): 
 Width (top): 
 Height:

Silver bars 
 Fineness: minimum of 999.0 parts per thousand silver
 Marks: serial number, refiner's hallmark, fineness, year of manufacture
 Silver content:  (Bars manufactured after January 1, 2008);  (Bars manufactured prior to January 1, 2008);  recommended
 Recommended dimensions
 Length (top): 
 Width (top): 
 Height: 
Weight is not recommended to be stamped on bars of either gold or silver, because bars will be officially weighed on delivery, and this weight, which may be different from that originally marked, will prevail. A bar's weight may also change by handling or sampling, thus invalidating the original mark.

Non–Good Delivery 
Bars that do not comply with Good Delivery rules are termed Non–Good Delivery. If they are similar to Good Delivery bars but do not fully meet the requirements, they must be stamped with "NGD" to distinguish them from conforming bars.

LBMA Good Delivery List 
The LBMA maintains two Good Delivery Lists of approved refineries (one for gold and one for silver) that meet certain minimum criteria (age, net worth, and production volume) and have demonstrated their ability to produce Good Delivery bars. Listed companies agree to submit to monitoring by the LBMA. Those listed companies that refuse to participate in regular monitoring are removed from the Good Delivery List and added to the Former List.

Good Delivery Referees 

Five companies are accredited by the LBMA as Good Delivery Referees in order to supervise the Good Delivery System and monitor the companies with Good Delivery certification. The referees' main functions are:

 Technical assessment of applicants for listing
 Proactive monitoring of refiners on the Good Delivery List
 Provision of technical advice on a range of topics

The companies accredited as referees are:
 Argor-Heraeus SA (Switzerland)
 Metalor Technologies SA (Switzerland)
 PAMP SA (Switzerland)
 Rand Refinery (PTY) Ltd (South Africa)
 Tanaka Kikinzoku Kogyo K.K. (Japan)

See also 
 Doré bar
 Gold as an investment
 Gold bar
 Gold reserve
 Gold standard
 Inflation hedge
 London Platinum and Palladium Market
 Palladium as an investment
 Platinum as an investment
 Refining (metallurgy)
 Silver as an investment
 Silver standard

References

External links 
 LBMA - Good Delivery Explained
 LBMA - Good Delivery Rules

Gold
Silver
Commodity markets